Angus Arthur Ferguson, QPM, formerly a detective with the Edinburgh City Police was Chief Constable of Northamptonshire Constabulary from 1931 until 1941. His father was a British Army officer and police officer, who served as His Majesty's Inspector of Constabulary in Scotland from 1904 to 1927.

References

1903 births
British Chief Constables
Scottish recipients of the Queen's Police Medal
Northamptonshire
Year of death missing